Cheat Codes is a collaborative studio album by American songwriter/producer Danger Mouse and American emcee Black Thought, released on August 12, 2022 by BMG. It followed three albums of solo work for Black Thought, but was Danger Mouse's first hip-hop album since The Mouse and the Mask in 2005.

Dates for the start of the album's production differ, including 2005 when the pair worked on their first tracks together, 2017 when they first had the idea for an album, and 2018 when the bulk of the work was started. After delays due to the COVID-19 pandemic and tracklist changes, it was first announced in a 2020 radio interview with Black Thought where he mentioned its draft title Dangerous Thoughts.

Promotional campaign
The first single from the album, "No Gold Teeth", was issued on May 11, 2022. It was accompanied by a promotional video directed by the creative team UNCANNY, in which Black Thought raps while his head is permanently obscured by changing images. 

The second single to be released was "Because" on June 8. This was promoted by another UNCANNY directed video, released nearly a month later on July 7. 

A third single and accompanying video, "Aquamarine", followed on July 13. The final pre-LP single, "Strangers", emerged on August 9, three days before the album's release. A promotional video for the song followed on August 12 to coincide with the release of the album. 

After the album's release, a video for the MF DOOM collaboration, "Belize", was released on October 18.

Critical reception

Upon release, Cheat Codes was met with critical acclaim. At Metacritic, which assigns a normalized rating out of 100 to reviews from professional publications, the album received an average score of 83, based on 17 reviews.

Reviewing the album for AllMusic, Andy Kellman described it as a combination of "'60s and '70s psych, prog, and soul recordings that are moody, trippy, and sometimes eerie. The crisp if soot-coated drums, smeared strings, moaning organs, and gnarled guitars are all very compatible with Thought, who scythes through it all with unparalleled wordplay delivered with surgical precision."

US President Barack Obama listed "Belize" as one of his favourite tracks of 2022.

Track listing

Samples 
 "Sometimes" contains samples from Gwen McCrae.
 "The Darkest Part" contains samples from Kiki Dee's "Rest My Head".
 "No Gold Teeth" contains samples from Hugh Masekela's "Stop".
 "Because" contains samples from "You Don't Have to Worry" by Doris & Kelly.
 "Belize" contains samples from Federal Duck.
 "Identical Deaths" contains samples from "Future Recollections" by Raw Material.
 "Strangers" contains samples from Philwit & Pegasus.
 "Saltwater" contains samples from "L'Amico Suicida" by Biglietto Per L'Inferno.
 "Violas & Lupitas" contains samples from the film Harlem Nights.

Personnel 
 Black Thought – vocals, engineering
 Danger Mouse – production, engineering
 Kennie Takahashi – mixing, engineering
 Bob Weston – mastering
 Jacob Escobedo – cover art
 Samantha Meadows – layout

Charts

References 

2022 albums
Black Thought albums
Danger Mouse (musician) albums
Albums produced by Danger Mouse (musician)